is a metropolitan garden in Chūō ward, Tokyo, Japan. Located at the mouth of the Sumida River, it was opened to the public on April 1, 1946. A landscaped garden of 250,216 m² includes Shioiri-no-ike (Tidal Pond), and the garden is surrounded by a seawater moat filled by Tokyo Bay. It was remodeled as a public garden on the site of a villa belonging to the ruling Tokugawa family in the 17th century.

At the centre of Shioiri-no-ike is a teahouse, reached by two bridges, where visitors can enjoy refreshments, such as matcha and Japanese sweets, in the tea-ceremony style. The garden includes a peony garden, a plum tree grove and fields with flowers for every season. Japanese falconry and aikido are demonstrated at New Year.

History
In 1654, Tokugawa Tsunashige, the younger brother of Shōgun Tokugawa Iemitsu and daimyō of Kōfu Domain, received permission to reclaim land from Edo Bay, upon which he built a villa and garden. The property was inherited by his son, Tokugawa Ienobu, who later became 6th Tokugawa shōgun. Succeeding generations of shōgun used the location as a secondary residence, and from the time of Tokugawa Ienari through Tokugawa Ieyoshi, it was a place where the shōgun could indulge in falconry. The main palace at Hama was destroyed by fire in 1724, and was not rebuilt since. In 1729, an elephant which had been received by the shōgun as a present from Annam was kept on the grounds for 12 years. During the Bakumatsu period, the site was turned over to the Tokugawa Navy as a training ground. In 1867, the shogunate erected a western-style stone building as a place for foreign diplomats to stay when visiting Edo.

In 1879, Emperor Meiji received Crown Prince Frederick William of Germany at the Hama-rikyū. Later that year, former United States President Ulysses Grant stayed for a month at the Hama-rikyū during his extended visit to Japan. The state guest house was demolished in 1889. The gardens burned during the 1923 Great Kanto earthquake and again in March 1945 during the Tokyo air raid. In November 1945, the Hama-rikyū was transferred from the Imperial Household Agency to Tokyo Metropolis and was opened as a public garden in April 1946. In 1952, it was designated as a Special National Historic Site and also as a Special National Place of Scenic Beauty. Various teahouses have been reconstructed in the 2010s.

Access
Visitors can access the garden via either of the two northern gates or via the Tokyo Cruise Ship (water bus) on a 35-minute ride from Asakusa.

Main Exit
Tsukijishijō Station (Toei Ōedo Line) - 7 minutes walk
Shiodome Station (Toei Ōedo Line) - 7 minutes walk
Shiodome Station (Yurikamome Line) - 7 minutes walk
Shimbashi Station (Toei Asakusa Line) - 12 minutes walk

Middle Exit
Shiodome Station (Toei Ōedo Line) - 5 minutes walk
Hamamatsuchō Station (Yamanote Line) - 15 minutes walk

Water Bus
Tokyo Cruise Ship ( Water Bus) arrives at and departs from inside the garden.

The water bus ticket includes admission to the garden.

Gallery

See also

List of Special Places of Scenic Beauty, Special Historic Sites and Special Natural Monuments
List of Historic Sites of Japan (Tōkyō)
Statue of Umashimadenomikoto

References

External links

 Hama-rikyu Gardens - Tokyo Metropolitan Park Association
 Hama-rikyu Gardens - Go Tokyo (Tokyo Convention & Visitors Bureau)
 Hama-rikyu Gardens Gallery
 "Tokyo Cruise Ship ( Water Bus)" - Hamarikyu official website

1654 establishments in Japan
Chūō, Tokyo
Gardens in Tokyo
Special Historic Sites
Special Places of Scenic Beauty
Tokyo Bay